Lorck is a Norwegian and Danish surname. Notable people with the surname include:

 Anna Lorck, New Zealand politician
 Carl Lorck (1829–1882), Norwegian painter
 Melchior Lorck (c.1526–c.1583), Danish-German painter, draughtsman, and printmaker

See also
 Lorch (disambiguation)

Norwegian-language surnames
Danish-language surnames